Private Communities Registry is a privately held company which owns PrivateCommunities.com, the longest-running website providing information about master-planned communities in the United States. The website helps affluent consumers research the lifestyle and amenities offered at hundreds of gated, golf, retirement, and vacation home communities. Each month, PrivateCommunities.com matches more than 70,000 potential home buyers with communities meeting their criteria.

History 
Vero Beach, Florida-based PrivateCommunities.com was founded in 1996 by Marie Roberts and Elisabeth Miller-Fox, both experienced real estate developers.  It was the first website to present information about master-planned communities to retirement and second home buyers. Echoing growing internet use, PrivateCommunities.com jumped from 2.2 million unique visitors in 2005 to attracting 3.6 million unique visitors in 2008, even given the number of foreclosures during the U.S. Great Recession.

Services and market
According to Claritas PRIZM, a customer segmentation system owned by The Nielsen Company, 63% of PrivateCommunities.com's website visitors represent  the nation's wealthiest elite, while 22% are in the 2nd most affluent segment, and 9% are in the mid income range. The study also noted that the majority of the site's visitor profiles are interested in retirement real estate and second home/ vacation properties.

Clients of PrivateCommunities.com are exclusive communities located throughout the United States including The Landings on Skidaway Island, Red Ledges, St. James Plantation, Kiawah Island, Daniel Island, Palmetto Bluff, and Brays Island Plantation, among others. Large real estate developers and home builders are also associated with PrivateCommunities.com.

Awards and Associations 
In 1997, Private Communities Registry was selected as a semi-finalist in Inc. magazine's Marketing Master Awards, sponsored by Lexmark International.

References

External links 
 

Companies based in Florida
Geodemographic databases
Planned communities in the United States
American real estate websites